María Paula Castelli Deluca (born 23 November 1972) is an Argentine former field hockey player who competed in the 1996 Summer Olympics.

References

External links
 

1972 births
Living people
Las Leonas players
Argentine people of Italian descent
Argentine female field hockey players
Olympic field hockey players of Argentina
Field hockey players at the 1996 Summer Olympics
Pan American Games medalists in field hockey
Pan American Games gold medalists for Argentina
Field hockey players at the 1995 Pan American Games
Medalists at the 1995 Pan American Games